Peter Bastiansen (born 3 May 1962) is a former professional tennis player from Denmark.

Biography
Bastiansen was a regular member of the Denmark Davis Cup team throughout the 1980s, which included stints in the World Group. He won 18 of the 29 singles matches that he played. All of his 16 doubles rubbers were with Michael Mortensen, for 10 wins. He helped Denmark qualify for the World Group for the first time when he won both of his singles rubbers in the 1982 Europe Zone final against Hungary in Budapest. The win in the reverse singles was over Balázs Taróczy and kept them in the tie, before Mortensen won it for Denmark in the final rubber. He was a member of the Danish team that defeated Spain in the 1988 Davis Cup World Group, to make the quarter-finals.

His touring career began in 1982 and he won a Challenger title that year, the Tampere Open. In 1983 he had a win over former world number one Ilie Năstase at a Grand Prix tournament in Viña del Mar. Another good win came at the 1983 WCT Tournament of Champions where he upset American player Brian Teacher. He made the quarter-finals at the Campionati Internazionali di Sicilia in Palermo in 1984, as a qualifier.

He played in one Grand Slam event, the men's doubles at the 1987 French Open, partnering Michael Tauson.

Challenger titles

Singles: (1)

Doubles: (3)

See also
List of Denmark Davis Cup team representatives

References

External links
 
 
 

1962 births
Living people
Danish male tennis players
Sportspeople from Copenhagen
20th-century Danish people